Nicholas Turner may refer to:

 Nicholas Turner (cricketer) (born 1983), New Zealand cricketer
 Nicholas Turner (chemist), British chemist